Cantiano is a comune (municipality) in the Province of Pesaro e Urbino in the Italian region Marche, located about 100 km (62 mi) west of Ancona and about 70 km (44 mi) southwest of Pesaro. The Burano flows in the town.

References

External links
 Official website

Cities and towns in the Marche